Una storia d'amore may refer to:

Una storia d'amore, also known as Love Story, a 1942 Italian film
Una storia d'amore (1969 film), a 1969 Italian film by Michele Lupo
Una storia d'amore, a 1975 album by :it:Juli & Julie
"Una storia d'amore", a song by Jovanotti from the 2006 album Buon Sangue